Adhemarius mexicanus is a species of moth in the family Sphingidae. It was described by Manuel Artemio Balcázar-Lara and Carlos R. Beutelspacher in 2001, and is known from Mexico, where it is found from Oaxaca to Jalisco.

References

Adhemarius
Moths described in 2001
Moths of Central America